Northern Lights College (NLC) is an institution that provides post-secondary education to residents of Northern British Columbia. It currently has campuses and access centers in eight communities across the northern third of British Columbia, with Regional Administration located on the Dawson Creek campus. NLC has a working agreement with the University of Northern British Columbia. The college President and CEO (Oct. 2015) is Dr. Bryn Kulmatycki.

History

Jim Kassen began his 25-year career as the college president in 1980 and retired in 2005 seeing the college expand beyond the Dawson Creek campus to five campuses and three access centres.

List of campuses

Dawson Creek 
Fort St. John
Fort Nelson
Tumbler Ridge
Chetwynd

List of Access Centres

Atlin
Dease Lake
Hudson's Hope

Programs
Northern Lights College offers programs in the following areas:
Trades and Apprenticeships/Auto/Heavy Mechanical/Plumbing/Carpentry/Cook/Power Engineering/Wind Turbine/Electrical/Millwright/Welding/Aircraft Maintenance Technician.
University Arts and Sciences/ Academic
Business Management/Applied Business Technology
Career and College Preparation/ Upgrading
Workforce Training/Continuing Education
Oil & Gas Technologies
Clean Energy Technologies 
Early Childhood Education and Care/ Education Assistant
Teacher Training
Practical Nursing/Health Care Assistant
Aircraft Maintenance Technician, Canadian Armed Forces Accredited, Transport Canada Approved/Accredited.

Aboriginal services
Northern Lights College has Aboriginal Gathering Spaces located at the following campuses: Dawson Creek, Fort St. John, Chetwynd and Fort Nelson.

The Fort Nelson Gathering Space opened in 2009, while the remaining Gathering Spaces opened in 2011.

The opening of the Chetwynd Gathering Space was highlighted by the attendance of then Lieutenant Governor of British Columbia, Steven L. Point.

In 2021 Northern Lights College received $70,000 to support two Indigenous education endowment and project funds.

Scholarships and bursaries
The Northern Lights College Foundation is the recipient of funds held in trust for various awards for education. Formed in 1981, the Foundation's objectives are: 
 to foster community interest in promoting higher education and training
 to act as a recipient of trust funds in the form of monies or other properties
 to assist in community projects and promotion of higher education and to grant monies to Northern Lights College for the designated use of scholarships and bursaries to be awarded to students.
The Government of Canada sponsors an Aboriginal Bursaries Search Tool that lists over 680 scholarships, bursaries, and other incentives offered by governments, universities, and industry to support Aboriginal post-secondary participation. Northern Lights College scholarships for Aboriginal, First Nations and Métis students include Awards for Aboriginal Women

Notable Faculty and Alumni
Bob Zimmer, Canadian politician and a Member of Parliament in the House of Commons of Canada.

See also
List of institutes and colleges in British Columbia
List of universities in British Columbia
Higher education in British Columbia
Education in Canada

References

External links
Official website

Colleges in British Columbia
Dawson Creek
Educational institutions established in 1975
1975 establishments in British Columbia